The Bay of Campeche, or Campeche Sound, is a bight in the southern area of the Gulf of Mexico, forming the north side of the Isthmus of Tehuantepec. It is surrounded on three sides by the Mexican states of Campeche, Tabasco and Veracruz. It was named by Francisco Hernández de Córdoba and Antón de Alaminos during their expedition in 1517.

Oil resources
The Cantarell Complex of five oil fields lies beneath the Bay of Campeche. In 2003, it was the second most productive oil field in the world, then supplying about two thirds of Mexico's crude oil output, but it went into a steep decline soon thereafter.

On June 3, 1979, Ixtoc I, an exploratory oil well located in the bay, suffered a blowout that caused a catastrophic explosion, resulting in what has been ranked as the third largest unintentional oil spill in history.

Climate
During the months of June and July, the Bay of Campeche is considered one of the "hot" breeding spots for Atlantic hurricanes. 

It experiences strong winds from the north from November into February along its western edge, with the winds ultimately funneling between the mountains and out into the Pacific near Salina Cruz.

On the other hand, the bay is also known for being a hurricane "graveyard", with unusually weak steering currents in the area causing hurricanes to slow down and meander, starving themselves (for example, Hurricane Roxanne in 1995). The bay is also considered the eastern border on the main migration routes for birds in the Americas.

Bay of Campeche Pictorials

References

Notes

External links
 
 

Campeche
Campeche
Gulf Coast of Mexico
Landforms of Campeche
Bights (geography)
Campeche City